HMS Florizel (J404), US pennant No. BAM-26, was an  ordered by the US Navy to be supplied to the Royal Navy (RN) under Lend-lease. Florizel was built by Associated Ship Builders at Harbour Island, Seattle, Washington, United States and commissioned by the Royal Navy as Pennant No. J404.  She was ordered 24 March 1942, laid down 27 January 1943, launched 20 May 1943 and commissioned 14 April 1944.

1944 Collision

On 10 December 1944 HMS Charlestown collided with Florizel off Harwich, England.  Due to the Charlestowns advanced age — the keel was laid more than 26½ years earlier — and the pressing need for experienced crews on newer warships, the Royal Navy declined repairs. Florizel survived the encounter and returned to duty.

Post war history
 14 Dec 1946 Sold to Greece
 1947 Renamed Merchant Ship Aida
 1953 Converted to a cargo ship
 1959 Renamed Lasithi
 1967 Broken up in Messina

Other ships named Florizel
  a passenger ship commissioned in 1909 and sank off of St. John's, Newfoundland.
 SS Empire Florizel (169503) was a short lived UK transport ship launched 21 April 1943 and was bombed and sunk on 21 Jul 1943 off Augusta, Sicily.

References

Auk-class minesweepers
World War II minesweepers of the United Kingdom
Ships built in Seattle
1943 ships